Le Moyne College is a private Jesuit college in DeWitt, New York. It was founded by the Society of Jesus in 1946 and named after Jesuit missionary Simon Le Moyne. At its founding, Le Moyne was the first co-educational Jesuit college in the United States.

History
Founded by the Society of Jesus in 1946 and named after the Jesuit missionary Simon Le Moyne, the college has graduated more than 35,000 students as of 2021. At its founding, Le Moyne was the first Jesuit co-educational college in the United States.

Walter A. Foery, the Roman Catholic Bishop of Syracuse, helped bring about the formation of Le Moyne  College. Foery purposed to provide for the city of Syracuse "a truly American school with religion and morality as the foundation stones". The college's first home was a storefront on East Onondaga Street in Syracuse. Later, it moved to the Hiscock Mansion on James Street. The college moved to its current (as of 2021) campus in 1948.

As of 2020, the college enrolled more than 3,700 students. As of 2021, the college offers more than 30 majors, an evening program, a variety of graduate courses, and a doctoral program in executive leadership.

Leadership
In 2014, Linda LeMura, formerly the college's provost and academic vice president, was appointed as the 14th president of Le Moyne College. LeMura is the first laywoman in history to serve as president of a Jesuit college or university.

Campus 
Le Moyne College's  campus is mostly located in the suburban town of DeWitt, although a small portion of the campus is within the city of Syracuse. As of 2021, there are 35 buildings on the campus.

Traditions

Welcoming traditions
Le Moyne College begins every academic year with two rituals: (1) 'Moving In Weekend,' when current students help to carry the boxes and suitcases of the new, first-year students into the dormitories; and (2) the Mass of the Holy Spirit, which continues a tradition dating back to the first Jesuit school, established in Messina, Sicily in 1548 (probably preceding this date). The meaning of this Mass is based in Catholic theology; the campus community commits to seeking knowledge as a community of scholars. The song "Stay with Us," composed by Le Moyne alumna M.D. Ridge especially for Le Moyne College, is performed.

Dolphy Day
Another annual tradition at Le Moyne College is "Dolphy Day," which originated in 1971. Dolphy Day is named for Eric Dolphy and has been said to have been inspired by Frank Zappa's song, "The Eric Dolphy Memorial Barbecue." Although Le Moyne's mascot is a dolphin, campus officials say there is no direct relation between the name of this event and this college icon. Each year, a "Wizard" is chosen (by the preceding Wizard).

Green initiatives 
Environmental sustainability is integrated into Le Moyne College facilities planning and operating processes. 
In June 2010, the college began construction on a new,  science facility. The science complex provides teaching and research space for use by faculty and students in the science and health professions. Its environmentally-sound design features include day lighting, solar preheating, and thermal storage, resulting in the award of LEED-Gold certification.

Athletics 

The Le Moyne Dolphins are the athletic teams for the college. Le Moyne competes in the NCAA at the Division II level for its 21 varsity teams and offers participation opportunities for over 340 students. Since 2003 Le Moyne Men's Lacrosse has won Five NCAA National Championships Le Moyne competes in Northeast-10 Conference in all sports.

Notable alumni
Bob Antonacci, former NYS Senate Member, NYS Supreme Court Judge
Carmen Amato, author and retired CIA Officer
Kris M. Balderston, Public affairs consultant; former managing director of the Global Partnership Initiative and Deputy Special Representative for Global Partnerships in the Office of the US Secretary of State; former Deputy Chief of Staff, US Senator Hillary Clinton
Thomas J. Barrett, former Deputy Secretary of Transportation, United States Department of Transportation (USDOT), and retired Vice Admiral, United States Coast Guard (USCG)
Aida M. Brewer, First female treasurer of New York State.
Tom Browning (1960-2022), retired Major League Baseball pitcher for the Cincinnati Reds and Kansas City Royals
Henry Braden (1944–2013), African-American politician in New Orleans, Louisiana
Ann Marie Buerkle, former Republican United States Congresswoman, New York's 25th congressional district (2010–2012) and current Acting Commissioner of the U.S. Consumer Product Safety Commission
Kathleen Carey, health economist and professor
Lorrie Clemo, 15th president of D'Youville College
Kate Clinton, feminist humorist
Nina Davuluri, Miss America 2014 completed nine pre-med courses at Le Moyne.
Tom DeFalco, former Editor-in-Chief, Marvel Comics
Tim DeKay, actor, co-star of White Collar; also played Clayton "Jonesy" Jones in the HBO series Carnivàle and "Bizarro Jerry" in an episode of Seinfeld
Jim Deshaies, former Major League Baseball pitcher and currently a TV commentator with the Chicago Cubs
Isaiah Eisendorf (born 1996), American-Israeli basketball player in the Israeli Basketball Premier League
 Laurence Ekperigin (born 1988), British-American basketball player in the Israeli National League
Jeanette J. Epps, NASA astronaut
Siobhan Fallon Hogan, actress, Forrest Gump, Boiler Room, Saturday Night Live, Seinfeld, Men in Black, Holes, The Negotiator, Baby Mama
Dennis Gorski, former Erie County, New York County Executive and current Cheektowaga, New York Town Justice
Josiah Gray, Major League Baseball pitcher for the Washington Nationals
Michael Charles Green, Executive Deputy Commissioner of the NYS Department of Criminal Justice Services; former Monroe County, NY District Attorney & Federal Judge Nominee
Mary Jacobus (1956–2009), former President & Chief Operating Officer of The New York Times Company
Wright L. Lassiter III, President and chief executive officer, Henry Ford Health System
William D. Law, Retired President of St. Petersburg College in Florida
Robert Manfred, Commissioner of Major League Baseball. Attended Le Moyne from 1976 to 1978.
Jerome McGann, scholar of literary editing
Peter Muserlian, CEO Pemco Group Inc.
Neil Olshey, President of Basketball Operations & General Manager, Portland Trail Blazers. Previously General Manager of the Los Angeles Clippers
Andy Parrino, former Major League Baseball player
Augusto Perez, paralympic curler
Eugene F. Pigott Jr., Judge of the New York Court of Appeals
Nicholas J. Pirro, former Onondaga County Executive
Tenzin Priyadarshi, Director of The Dalai Lama Center for Ethics and Transformative Values at the Massachusetts Institute of Technology (MIT) and founding President of the Prajnopaya Foundation
Jon Ratliff, former Major League Baseball pitcher, appeared in 1 game for the Oakland Athletics
Don Savage (basketball) (1928–2010), former professional basketball player for the Syracuse Nationals
Carl Schramm, former president and CEO, Ewing Marion Kauffman Foundation
Charles J. Siragusa, Judge of the United States District Court for the Western District of New York
John Douglas Thompson, Shakespearean actor
Jim Wessinger, former Major League Baseball second baseman for the Atlanta Braves; first Le Moyne player to be selected in the MLB Draft
Valerie Woods, 12th Speaker of the House of Representatives of Belize
James Zogby, founder and President of the Arab American Institute based in Washington, D.C.
John Zogby, Political analyst & former president and CEO, Zogby International (creator of the Zogby Poll)
José Zúñiga, actor, Con Air, Twilight, 24, CSI: Crime Scene Investigation, and more

Faculty and administrators 
Among those faculty and administrators who serve or have served on the Le Moyne campus are:
Carmen Basilio (1927–2012), former Physical Education teacher at Le Moyne and a former World Champion boxer
John Beilein, former Head Men's Basketball Coach at Le Moyne from 1983 to 1992 and former Head Men's Basketball Coach at the University of Michigan, 2007-2019
Patrick Beilein, Head Men's Basketball Coach (2015–2019)
Daniel Berrigan (1921-2016), former Professor of New Testament Studies and founder of the International House at Le Moyne, social activist, author, poet
George Coyne (1933-2020), inaugural McDevitt Chair of Religious Philosophy at Le Moyne and former Head of the Vatican Observatory
John M. Corridan (1911-1984), former Economics Professor at Le Moyne and the inspiration for the character of Father Barry in the classic film On the Waterfront
Frank Haig, former President of Le Moyne from 1981 to 1987 and younger brother of former U.S. Secretary of State Alexander Haig
John J. McNeill (1925-2015), former professor at Le Moyne, noted Peace Activist during the Vietnam War and an advocate for LGBT rights
Joseph M. McShane former professor and Chair of Religious Studies at Le Moyne and current President of Fordham University
J. Donald Monan (1924-2017), administrator and faculty member at Le Moyne from 1961 through 1972, later served as President of Boston College from 1972 to 1996
Dave Paulsen, former Head Men's Basketball Coach at Le Moyne from 1997 to 2000 and current Head Men's Basketball Coach at George Mason University
Harold Ridley (1939-2005), former professor, English Department Chair, and Chief Academic Officer at Le Moyne and former President of Loyola College in Maryland
Margaret C. Snyder, first Dean of Women at Le Moyne and a noted social scientist with a special interest in women and economic development, particularly in Africa.

See also
 List of Jesuit sites

References

External links 

 Official website
 Official athletics website

 
Jesuit universities and colleges in the United States
Educational institutions established in 1946
1946 establishments in New York (state)
Catholic universities and colleges in New York (state)
DeWitt, New York